A list of airfields of the Royal Flying Corps.

British Isles

France

 Saint-Omer, France, 1914–1918 (Headquarters) - now Saint-Omer Wizernes Airport and site of British Air Services Memorial
 Candas No 2 Aircraft Depot (2AD) formed 13.12.15 - Spring 1918
 Fienvillers No 2 Aeroplane Supply Depot (2ASD) formed 1.11.17
 Rang-du-Fliers 2AD moved after German Spring Offensive
 St Andre aux Bois/Verton 2ASD moved after German Spring Offensive
 Saint-Léger-lès-Authie
 Sombrin (Vaulx-Vraucourt)

Canada

The Royal Flying Corps Canada was established by the RFC in 1917 to train aircrew in Canada. Air stations were established in southern Ontario at the following locations:

 Camp Borden 1917–1918
 Armour Heights Field 1917–1918 (pilot training, School of Special Flying to train instructors)
 Leaside Aerodrome 1917–1918 (Artillery Cooperation School)
 Long Branch Aerodrome 1917–1918
 Curtiss School of Aviation (flying-boat station with temporary wooden hangar on the beach at Hanlan's Point on Toronto Island 1915–1918; main school, airstrip and metal hangar facilities at Long Branch)
 Camp Rathbun, Deseronto 1917–1918 (pilot training)
 Camp Mohawk (now Tyendinaga (Mohawk) Airport) 1917-1918 – located at the Tyendinaga Indian Reserve (now Tyendinaga Mohawk Territory) near Belleville 1917–1918 (pilot training)
 Hamilton (Armament School) 1917–1918
 Beamsville Camp (School of Aerial Fighting) 1917-1918 - located at 4222 Saan Road in Beamsville, Ontario; hangar remains and property now used by Global Horticultural Incorporated

Other locations

 Ismailia, Egypt (training - No. 57 TS, 32 (Training) Wing HQ) - now Al Ismailiyah Air Base
 Aboukir, Egypt 1916–1918 (training - No. 22 TS & No. 23 TS, 20 (Training) Wing HQ)
 Abu Sueir, Egypt 1917-1918 (training - No. 57 TS & No. 195 TS) - now Abu Suwayr Air Base, also used by RAF during World War II
 El Ferdan, Egypt (training – No. 17 TDS)
 El Rimal, Egypt 1917-1918 (training – No. 19 TDS) - later as RAF El Amiriya and now abandoned (after World War II)
 Camp Taliaferro, North Texas, USA 1917–1918 (training) - sites now either residential development or commercial/industrial parks

References

 
Royal Flying Corps airfields